American Hero may refer to:

 American Hero (novel), written by Larry Beinhart
 American Hero (film), a 2015 American-British film
 American Hero (video game), a cancelled interactive movie game for Atari Jaguar
 American Heroes, a book by Oliver North
 American sub or American hero, a sandwich

See also
 The Greatest American Hero, a 1981-1983 American television series
 The Last American Hero, a 1973 sports film based on the true story of Junior Johnson